SPARCstation 5 or SS5 (code-named Aurora) is a workstation introduced by Sun Microsystems in March 1994. It is based on the sun4m architecture, and is enclosed in a pizza-box chassis. Sun also offered a SPARCserver 5 without a framebuffer. A simplified, cheaper version of the SS5 was released in February 1995 as the SPARCstation 4. Sun also marketed these same machines under the "Netra" brand, without framebuffers or keyboards and preconfigured with all the requisite software to be used as web servers. An estimated 400,000+ SPARCstation 5s were sold.

Specifications

Release Price

CPU support
The SPARCstation 5 may incorporate one of the following processors: 70, 85, or 110 MHz Sun Microsystems microSPARC-II, or a 170 MHz Fujitsu Microelectronics, Inc. (FMI) TurboSPARC. Fujitsu also provided a 160 MHz TurboSPARC CPU Upgrade Kit for upgrading 70, 85 and 110 MHz microSPARC-II models. The SPARCstation 5 has no MBus and thus is limited to use as a single-processor machine.

Memory 
The SPARCstation 5 has eight DSIMM slots for memory expansion.  Slots can be filled individually with either 8 MB or 32 MB modules giving a maximum of 256 MB memory.  The SPARCstation 4 uses the same memory.

Disk drives 
The SPARCstation 5 can hold two internal 80-pin SCA, single-ended, fast-narrow SCSI drives, a SCSI CD-ROM drive and a floppy. It also supports external SCSI devices. There is no IDE/ATAPI support.

Network support
The SPARCstation 5 comes with an on-board AMD Lance ethernet chipset providing 10BASE-T networking as standard and 10Base2 and 10Base5 via an AUI transceiver. A 10/100Mbit/s hme "Happy Meal" NIC can be added for faster connections. The OpenBoot ROM is able to boot from network, using RARP and TFTP. Like all other SPARCstation systems, the SS5 holds system information such as MAC address and serial number in NVRAM. If the battery on this chip dies, then the system will not be able to boot until the NVRAM is reprogrammed.

Expansion / AFX
The SPARCstation 5 has three SBus expansion slots which are typical of Sun computer equipment of this era.  The third of these shares its expansion backplate and physical space with a special AFX connector which was unique to the SPARCstation 5.  Only one card was released for this slot, known as the S24 or TCX.  This was a framebuffer that allowed the use of 24-bit colour graphics instead of the 8-bit colour of the SBus CG6 card, also known as the LEGO (Low End Graphics Option).

SPARCstation 4
The SPARCstation 4 (code-named Perigee) was introduced in February 1995 to provide a lower price point than the SPARCstation 5 and replace the SPARCclassic. Although offered with the same 70, 85, or 110 MHz microSPARC-II processor as the SPARCstation 5, it has only one SBus expansion slot instead of three, a single 1.05 GB hard drive, and maximum memory capacity of 160 MB instead of 256 MB (five DSIMM slots). Instead of the built-in audio of the SPARCstation 5, the SPARCstation 4 requires an optional module, installed in its own dedicated slot. The system includes a built-in 8-bit color pixel-accelerated graphics adapter (TCX) capable of 1152x900 (or 1280x1024 with an optional 1 MB VSIMM), and a new lower-cost 17" monitor was introduced as an option. There is no AFX graphics port.

The SPARCstation 4 has a standard AUI Ethernet connector, unlike the SPARCstation 5 which requires a special cable to mate with a non-standard connector.

SPARC Xterminal 1
Sun used the same enclosure as the SPARCstation 4 for the SPARC Xterminal 1, which was, as the name implies, marketed as an X terminal, with no local storage. Unlike the earlier SPARCclassic X, it did not use the same motherboard as the workstation it was derived from, instead using a lower-powered 50 MHz microSPARC processor and expansion from its base memory of 8 MB to 128 MB rather than 160 MB (four DSIMM slots).

Rather than running Solaris, the SPARC Xterminal 1 and SPARCclassic X loaded and ran special software over the network.

Sun offered an upgrade kit to a full workstation that included a swap to a SPARCstation 4 motherboard, a hard drive and additional memory.

Operating systems

The following operating systems will run on a SPARCstation 5:
SunOS 4.1.3_U1B onwards
Solaris 2.3 Edition II to Solaris 9
Linux - Most distributions of Linux have compatibility issues with TurboSPARC variants
MirBSD/sparc
NetBSD/sparc
OpenBSD/sparc
NeXTSTEP - TurboSPARC variants not supported
OPENSTEP/Mach - TurboSPARC variants not supported

See also 
 SPARCstation

References

External links 
 Obsolyte: SPARCstation 5
 Parts List for SPARCstation 5
 "Sun AFX bus speeds graphics", article about the AFX bus and AFX graphics cards in Electronic News

Sun workstations
SPARC microprocessor products